Devon Koh-e Hindukush is a mountain of Hindu Kush in Parwan Province near Baghlan, Afghanistan.

References

Mountain passes of Afghanistan
Landforms of Parwan Province